Sergine Ibrahima Moreau (born February 25, 1986, in Kaolack, Senegal ) is a Senegalese footballer, who currently plays for ASD Mozzano.

Club career

Al-Karamah
In January 2011, Moreau signed for Syrian Premier League Club Al-Karamah on a five months deal. He played his first game for Al-Karamah on 22 February 2011 in the SPL match against Al-Futowa. The game ended 3–0 for Al-Karamah.

Return to Italy 
In May 2011 Moreau returned to Italy. He resides in Rimini and joined to play for ASD Mozzano.

References 

1986 births
Living people
Senegalese footballers
Association football defenders
AS Douanes (Senegal) players
ASC Jaraaf players
Al-Karamah players
Senegalese expatriate footballers
Expatriate footballers in Italy
Expatriate footballers in Syria
People from Kaolack
Syrian Premier League players